Carlos Pesina (born November 15, 1967) is an American martial artist and employee of NetherRealm Studios. He is most recognized as the actor who played Raiden in Mortal Kombat, Mortal Kombat II, and Mortal Kombat Trilogy. Since 1995, he has worked for Midway Games as a motion capture artist and animator.

In 1994, Pesina aided Data East USA on its failed attempt at a Mortal Kombat inspiration titled Tattoo Assassins. Despite the bad history, however, Carlos is still employed by Midway, now Netherrealm Studios, as an art lead.

The hidden playable character in Mortal Kombat: Deadly Alliance, Mokap, was created in tribute to Carlos' motion capture work at Midway. In the Konquest Mode of Mortal Kombat: Deception, the protagonist, Shujinko, has to do a quest for the ruler of Orderrealm; the ruler states that Shujinko needs to find an agent named "Parlos Casina", a spoonerism on Pesina's name, most likely celebrating his importance to the series.

Pesina appeared in a videogame-based comedy film entitled Press Start in which his character is named Lei Gong, the Chinese equivalent of Raiden. His older brother Daniel has also played various Mortal Kombat characters, until he and Midway parted due to a lawsuit over royalties.

Works

Video games

Film

External links
 Carlos Pesina on Twitter

Interview at Street Fighter RPG Brazil

1968 births
American male video game actors
American male voice actors
Living people
Male actors from Chicago